Elicinae is a subfamily of tropiduchid planthoppers in the family Tropiduchidae, with Elica the type genus.

Tribes and Genera
There are three extant (also 2 extinct) tribes:

Bucini
Auth.: Gnezdilov, Bartlett & Bourgoin, 2016 - S. America
 Buca Walker, 1858 c g
 †Krundia Szwedo, 2019

Elicini
Auth.:Melichar, 1915  Selected genera:
 Acrisius Stål, 1862
 Danepteryx Uhler, 1889 i c g b
 Dictyobia Uhler, 1889 i c g b
 Dictyonia Uhler, 1889 i c g b
 Dictyonissus Uhler, 1876
 Dictyssa Melichar, 1906
 Dyctidea Uhler, 1889
 Elica - monotypic Elica latipennis Walker, 1857 c g
 Misodema Melichar, 1907 i c g b
 Neaethus Stål, 1861 i c g b
 Osbornia Ball, 1910 i c g b

Parathisciini
Auth.:Gnezdilov, 2013 - Africa
 Hemithiscia Schmidt, 1912
 Paraphilatis Melichar, 1914
 Parathiscia Melichar, 1901
 Pseudothiscia Schmidt, 1912

Data sources: i = ITIS, c = Catalogue of Life, g = GBIF, b = Bugguide.net

References

Further reading

External links
 
 

 
Tropiduchidae
Insect subfamilies